The wedding of Albert II, Prince of Monaco, and Charlene Wittstock took place on 1 and 2 July 2011 at the Prince's Palace of Monaco. The groom was the sovereign prince of the Principality of Monaco. The bride was a South African Olympic swimmer. A two-day public holiday for the celebrations was declared.

Commentators said that the wedding would be important for Monaco to survive as a tax haven. Monegasque authorities believed that the event would increase tourism.
The civil ceremony was held in the Throne Room, conducted by Philippe Narmino, president of the Council of State, while the religious ceremony took place in the courtyard of the palace, and was presided over by Archbishop Bernard Barsi.

Engagement announcement

Prince Albert II is the current Sovereign Prince of Monaco, having succeeded his father Rainier III in April 2005. Charlene Wittstock was born in Rhodesia, but moved to South Africa with her family when she was 11. She has represented South Africa in swimming, and participated in the 2000 Sydney Olympics. She met Prince Albert at the 2000 Marenostrum International Swimming Meet in Monaco, which he presided over. She retired from swimming in 2007. Prince Albert was also an athlete, competing in bobsleigh in five Olympics. They made their public debut as a couple at the opening ceremony of the 2006 Winter Olympics. The Palace announced their engagement on 23 June 2010. The engagement ring featuring a pear-shaped three-carat diamond at the center and surrounding diamond brilliants.

The wedding was originally scheduled for 8 and 9 July 2011, but was moved forward to prevent a conflict with the International Olympic Committee (IOC) meeting in Durban on 5–9 July, which they both attended. The couple had invited members of the IOC, including president Jacques Rogge, to their wedding. A week before the wedding, the palace denied reports that Wittstock had been getting cold feet.L'Express reported that Wittstock tried to leave Monaco on 28 June, after rumours surfaced that Albert had fathered a third illegitimate child. The palace called the stories "ugly rumours" born out of jealousy.

On the occasion of Prince Albert II of Monaco' marriage to Wittstock, on 1 July 2011 the Stamp Issuing Office of Monaco issue the postage stamp (Block), created by Georgy Shishkin (laureate of competition).

Wedding

Ceremonies

Civil 
Festivities began on the night of 30 June, with a concert at the Stade Louis II by American rock band the Eagles. The concert was attended by 15,000 residents of Monaco and the couple themselves.

The civil ceremony took place on Friday, 1 July 2011, in the Throne Room of the Prince's Palace. The ceremony was conducted by Philippe Narmino, Director of Judicial Services and president of the Council of State. After the confirmation by Narmino, the newlywed couple signed the marriage register with a specially created pen made by Montblanc in gold and precious stone adorned with their monogram . Following the civil ceremony, Wittstock received the formal style Her Serene Highness The Princess of Monaco. The 20-minute ceremony was also attended by Prince Albert's sisters Caroline, Princess of Hanover, and Princess Stéphanie of Monaco. After the ceremony, the couple appeared on the balcony of the Salon des Glaces to salute the crowds. They waved and kissed each other, prompting another round of cheers from the crowd. The couple were also joined by Princesses Caroline and Stéphanie with their children, as well as Charlene's parents and brothers.

They joined the public in the Palace Square for a specially prepared buffet by chefs from South Africa and Monaco, headlined by multiple Michelin-starred chef Alain Ducasse. A free concert was performed by French composer Jean-Michel Jarre and his group at 22:00 hours on the Port Hercules, with an attendance of 100,000 guests. It included a display of lights, lasers and fireworks.

Religious 
The religious ceremony took place the following day in the courtyard of the Palace. Unlike the wedding of Prince Rainier and Princess Grace, the religious ceremony was not held in a cathedral. The ceremony was presided over by the Archbishop of Monaco, Bernard Barsi. The palace gates were open so that up to 3,500 guests could be seated for the ceremony, including seated guests watching giant screens in the palace square outside the gates. Additional display screens were set up throughout the principality. Part of the ceremony was in Afrikaans, a language of Dutch origin, which is spoken in Charlene's home country of South Africa. After the ceremony, the bride and groom traveled in a bespoke landaulet converted Lexus hybrid car to Sainte-Dévote Chapel, where Princess Charlene laid her bridal bouquet to Saint Devota, the patron saint of Monaco, in accordance with Monegasque tradition.

The dinner reception took place on the terraces of the Opéra de Monte-Carlo, followed by fireworks and the opening of the Opéra Ball. The Monte-Carlo Philharmonic Orchestra and the Opéra Choir performed under the direction of Lawrence Foster. Other performers included Andrea Bocelli, Renée Fleming, Pumeza Matshikiza accompanied by French guitarist Eric Sempe and percussionist Patrick Mendez, Juan Diego Flórez, Lisa Larsson, Wiebke Lehmkuhl, Kenneth Tarver, and Alexander Vinogradov.

Wedding attire
Wittstock wore a silken blue jacket with ankle-length pants by Chanel to the civil ceremony. Her wedding dress was designed by Giorgio Armani. Lexus was the official car supplier for the wedding. The bride wore diamond earrings by Tabbah at the civil ceremony, while at the religious ceremony, she wore the "Infinite Cascade" necklace designed by Nagib Tabbah, commissioned and made of 18k rose gold set with 1,237 diamonds and 6 pear shaped white pearls.

The bridesmaids were children dressed in the national dress of Monaco. The dresses were designed by Princess Caroline and Jean-Christophe Maillot, the director of the Les Ballets de Monte Carlo. The dresses featured personal touches, such as silk stockings embroidered with the couple's monogram, and aprons that featured both the couple's monogram and the name of the area of Monaco that each girl was from. Each outfit took more than 120 hours to create. The girls were also wearing necklaces of black velvet ribbon with gold crosses given to them by Prince Albert.

Wedding party
Christopher Levine, cousin of the groom, son of Princess Grace's sister Elizabeth Anne served as the best man, while Donatella Knecht de Massy, the wife of the groom's first cousin once removed, was appointed maid of honour.

Guests
The guest list consists of reigning and non-reigning royalty, other heads of state and government, ambassadors to Monaco from various countries, businessmen, entertainers, fashion designers, models, and sportspersons.
The following is a list of notable guests who attended the religious ceremony:

Grimaldi family
 The Princess and Prince of Hanover, the groom's elder sister and her husband
 Mr Andrea Casiraghi, the groom's nephew
 Miss Charlotte Casiraghi, the groom's niece
 Mr Pierre Casiraghi, the groom's nephew
 Princess Alexandra of Hanover, the groom's niece
 Princess Stéphanie of Monaco, the groom's younger sister
 Mr Louis Ducruet, the groom's nephew
 Miss Pauline Ducruet, the groom's niece
 Miss Camille Gottlieb, the groom's niece
 Baron Christian Louis and Baroness Cécilie Noghès de Massy, the groom's first cousin and his wife
 Jonkvrouw Leticia and Jonkheer Thomas of Brouwer, the groom's first cousin, once removed, and her husband
 Brice Noghès de Massy, the groom's first cousin, once removed
 Antoine  Noghès de Massy, the groom's first cousin, once removed
 Baroness Elisabeth-Anne Noghès de Massy, the groom's first cousin
 Baron Jean-Léonard and Baroness Susanna Taubert-Natta de Massy, the groom's first cousin, once removed, and his wife
 Mélanie-Antoinette Costello de Massy, the groom's first cousin, once removed
Mr Leon Leroy, widower of the groom's first cousin
 Keith Sébastien and Donatella Knecht de Massy, the groom's first cousin, once removed, and his wife
 Christine Knecht de Massy, the groom's first cousin, twice removed
 Alexia Knecht de Massy, the groom's first cousin, twice removed
 Vittoria Knecht de Massy, the groom's first cousin, twice removed

Wittstock family
 Michael Wittstock and Lynette Wittstock, the bride's parents
 Gareth Wittstock, the bride's younger brother
 Sean Wittstock, the bride's younger brother

Foreign royalty
 The King and Queen of Sweden
 The Crown Princess of Sweden and The Duke of Västergötland
 The Duke of Värmland
 The Duchess of Hälsingland and Gästrikland
 The King and Queen of the Belgians
 The Duke and Duchess of Brabant
 The Archduchess and Archduke of Austria-Este
 Prince Laurent and Princess Claire of Belgium
 The King of Lesotho
 The Grand Duke and Grand Duchess of Luxembourg
 The Hereditary Grand Duke of Luxembourg
 The Kgosi of Bafokeng, South Africa
 The Crown Prince and Crown Princess of Denmark (representing the Queen of Denmark)
 Prince Joachim and Princess Marie of Denmark
 The Prince of Orange and Princess Máxima of the Netherlands (representing the Queen of the Netherlands)
 The Crown Prince and Crown Princess of Norway (representing the King of Norway)
 The Hereditary Prince and Hereditary Princess of Liechtenstein (representing the Prince of Liechtenstein)
 The Crown Prince of Bahrain (representing the King of Bahrain)
 The Earl and Countess of Wessex (representing the Queen of the United Kingdom)
 Prince and Princess Michael of Kent
 Prince Faisal bin Al Hussein and Princess Sara Faisal of Jordan (representing the King of Jordan)
 Princess Lalla Meryem of Morocco (representing the King of Morocco)
 Princess Sirivannavari Nariratana of Thailand (representing the King of Thailand)

Royalty from non-reigning dynasties
 Empress Farah of Iran
 The Grand Duchess of Russia
 Grand Duke George Mikhailovich of Russia
 The Prince and Princess of Prussia
 The Crown Prince and Crown Princess of Serbia
 The Prince and Princess of Naples
 The Prince and Princess of Venice
 The Crown Princess and Prince Radu of Romania
 The Duke and Duchess of Anjou
 The Count and Countess of Paris
 The Duke and Duchess of Braganza
 The Duke and Duchess of Castro
 The Margrave and Margravine of Baden
 The Hereditary Prince and Hereditary Princess of Baden
  The Landgrave of Hesse
 The Aga Khan
 Prince Leopold and Princess Ursula of Bavaria
 Prince Christian of Hanover
 Princess Virginia of Fürstenberg
 Donna Beatrice Borromeo

Government and diplomacy
 George Abela (President of Malta)
 Maria Luisa Berti and Filippo Tamagnini (Captains Regent of San Marino)
 Ólafur Ragnar Grímsson (President of Iceland)
 Mary McAleese (President of Ireland)
 Nicolas Sarkozy (President of France)
 Pál Schmitt (President of Hungary)
 Michel Suleiman (President of Lebanon)
 Christian Wulff (Federal President of Germany)
 Jose Manuel Barroso (President of the European Commission)
 Marthinus Van Schalkwyk (Minister of Tourism of South Africa)
 Jeff Radebe (Minister of Justice and Constitutional Development of South Africa)
 Angelino Alfano (Minister of Justice of Italy)
 Karlheinz Töchterle (Minister for Science and Research of Austria)
 Salma Ahmed (Ambassador of Kenya to Monaco and France)
 Constantin Chalastanis (Ambassador of Greece to Monaco and France)
 Mirko Galic (Ambassador of Croatia to Monaco and France)
 Kornelios Korneliou (Ambassador of Cyprus to Monaco and France)
 Ulrich Lehner (Ambassador of Switzerland to Monaco and France)
 Marc Lortie (Ambassador of Canada to Monaco and France)
 Lejeune Mbella Mbella (Ambassador of Cameroon to Monaco and France)
 Tomasz Orlowski (Ambassador of Poland to Monaco and France)
 Charles Rivkin (Ambassador of the United States to Monaco and France)
 Missoum Sbih (Ambassador of Algeria to Monaco and France)
 Veronika Stabej (Ambassador of Slovenia to Monaco and France)
 Viraphand Vacharathit (Ambassador of Thailand to Monaco and France)

Sports personalities
 Thomas Bach    (former Olympic Fencer)
 Gerhard Berger (former Formula One racing driver)
 Jonas Björkman (former World Number 4 professional tennis player)
 Sergey Bubka (retired pole vaulter)
 Nadia Comăneci (gymnast)
 Charmaine Crooks (athlete)
 Bob Ctvrtlik (volleyball player)
 Sophie Edington (backstroke and freestyle swimmer)
 Patrice Evra (international footballer)
 Mark Foster (butterfly and freestyle swimmer)
 Frankie Fredericks (former track athlete)
 Graham Hill (swimming coach and former competitive swimmer)
 Jacky Ickx (former racing driver) and Khadja Nin
 Branislav Ivkovic (swimming coach, who trained Charlene Wittstock ahead of the 2008 Beijing Olympics)
 Byron Kelleher (rugby union half-back)
 Henri Leconte (former professional tennis player)
 Axel Lund Svindal (World Cup alpine ski racer)
 Julia Mancuso (alpine ski racer)
 Ian McIntosh (rugby union coach)
 Elana Meyer (former long-distance runner)
 Ilie Năstase (former professional tennis player)
 Ryk Neethling (swimmer)
 Terence Parkin (deaf swimmer)
 François Pienaar (former rugby player)
 Nicola Pietrangeli (former tennis player)
 Sarah Poewe (professional swimmer)
 Wayne Riddin (swimming coach and former competitive swimmer)
 Count Jacques Rogge (President of the International Olympic Committee)
 Roland Schoeman (swimmer)
 Sir Jackie Stewart (former racing driver and team owner)
 Jean Todt (President of the FIA) and Michelle Yeoh
 Franziska van Almsick (swimmer)
 Pernilla Wiberg (alpine ski racer, IOC member)

Fashion industry
 Giorgio Armani
 Roberta Armani
 Terrence Bray
 Naomi Campbell
 Roberto Cavalli
 Inès de La Fressange
 Sébastien Jondeau
 Karolína Kurková
 Tereza Maxová
Karl Lagerfeld

Celebrities and others
 Bernard Arnault and Hélène Mercier-Arnault
 Dame Shirley Bassey
 Andrea Bocelli (tenor, multi-instrumentalist and classical crossover artist)
 Bernadette Chirac (former First Lady of France)
 Bernice Coppieters (ballet artist and member of the Les Ballets de Monte Carlo)
 Donna D'Cruz (DJ and model)
 Renée Fleming
 Francisco Flores Pérez (President of El Salvador between 1999 and 2004)
 Juan Diego Flórez (opera tenor)
 Jean-Christophe Maillot (dancer and choreographer)
 Jean-Michel Jarre (musician)
 Pumeza Matshikiza (lyric soprano)
 Sir Roger Moore and Lady Moore
 Guy Laliberté (Canadian entrepreneur, philanthropist, poker player, space tourist and CEO of Cirque du Soleil)
 Yves Piaget (Swiss watch-maker and President of Piaget SA)
 Eric Peugeot (French marketing engineer)
 Bertrand Piccard
 Johann Rupert (South African businessman and chairman of Richemont, VenFin and Remgro)
 Eric Sempe (French guitarist)
 Sonu Shivdasani (Founder and CEO of the Soneva Group)
 Eva Malmstrom Shivdasani (Founder and Creative Director of the Soneva Group)
 Victoria Silvstedt (celebrity, model, actress, singer, and television personality)
 Sir Michael Smurfit
 Umberto Tozzi (pop/rock singer and composer)

Honeymoon
Their honeymoon started out at the International Olympic Committee meeting, in Durban, South Africa, where they stayed in the  £4600 a night Presidential Suite of the five star The Oyster Box hotel in Umhlanga, just north of Durban, South Africa. After the meeting was over, they flew to a paparazzi-free honeymoon in Mozambique.

References

External links
 Official Palace of Monaco Wedding site
 Stamp Issuing Office of Monaco
 Princely Wedding Monaco 2011

2011 in Monaco
House of Grimaldi
Monaco
July 2011 events in Europe
Albert